KCRV may refer to:

 KCRV (AM), a radio station (1370 AM) licensed to Caruthersville, Missouri, United States
 KCRV-FM, a radio station (105.1 FM) licensed to Caruthersville, Missouri, United States